Of the 6 South Carolina incumbents, only 3 were re-elected.

South Carolina switched to a general ticket for its two seats, instead of electing each one separately.  Only one candidate received a majority in the 1800 election, requiring an 1801 run-off election to choose a Representative for the second seat.

References

See also 
 List of United States representatives from South Carolina
 United States House of Representatives elections, 1800 and 1801

1800
South Carolina
United States House of Representatives